Blackberry Township is located in Kane County, Illinois. As of the 2010 census, its population was 15,090 and it contained 4,988 housing units. Most of its land use is agricultural.

Geography
The major part of the village of Elburn and a small part of the village of North Aurora are incorporated villages in Blackberry Township. The rest belongs to unincorporated  Kane County.

La Fox is a small unincorporated community in Blackberry Township on the train line to Chicago.

Demographics

References
 

Townships in Kane County, Illinois
Townships in Illinois